Company A-1 is the oldest outfit in the Texas A&M Corps of Cadets, having been the original outfit formed for all 20 of A&M's first cadets in 1876.

Unit genealogy
Company A (1876-1901)
Company A Infantry (1901-1916)
Company A Infantry, 1st Regiment (1917-?)
Company A Infantry (?-1959)
Company A-1 "Animal A" (1959–present)

Traditions

"For The Good Times"
In the early 1980s, Animal A faced disbandment due to increasingly shrinking recruiting classes and several disciplinary incidents. The cadets, convinced that the final football march-in would be the last for Company A-1, decided to play the song "For The Good Times" by country music singer Ray Price before they formed up to march out. As it turned out, Company A-1 would survive (and in fact continue to be the oldest surviving non-disbanded outfit in the Corps) and thrive in the coming years, returning to prominence in the Corps. To this day, Animal A continues to circle up before each home football game and put their arms around their fellow Animals, swaying back and forth to the slow, pulsing beat of "For The Good Times."

Ranger Joe
Company A-1 has long been known throughout the Corps as an outfit that has an exceptionally high rate of cadets who contract as officers in the U.S. Army. As such, A-1 adopted the "Ranger Joe" character meant to personify the grit, skill, and high standards of the U.S. Army Rangers as an unofficial company mascot. Ranger Joe has since appeared on most outfit signs and logos since the mid-20th century. Ranger Joe is also an addition to the outfit. Found in 2006 by Aaron Farmer '10, this red slider is passed down the sixth week of school to a fish of single status as a form of motivation.

Company Bonfire
After the collapse of the bonfire stack in 1999, the subsequent ban of an on-campus bonfire has prevented A-1 from participating in many of their time-honored bonfire traditions (including the fish eating a grasshopper at First Cut to prove they were an Animal). In the fall of 2003, the A-1 freshman class (the class of '07) decided to have a class bonfire at the ranch of one of their fish buddies. The  tradition continued the following year and became an official, outfit-wide function in the fall of 2005. The Company Bonfire is a perfect time for members of A-1 to display the strong work ethic, teamwork, and camaraderie that they develop as Animals. In 2016, A-1 was allowed to participate in Bonfire for the first time.

References

External links
Official website

Texas A&M University student organizations
Military education and training in the United States
Military units and formations established in 1876
1876 establishments in Texas